Snežana Zorić, married Mijalković, (born 16 January 1949) is former Yugoslavian and Serbian basketball player.

External links
Profile at mojacrvenazvezda.net

1949 births
Living people
Basketball players from Belgrade
Serbian women's basketball players
Yugoslav women's basketball players
Shooting guards
ŽKK Crvena zvezda players
Members of the Assembly of KK Crvena zvezda